Relyon is a bed and mattress manufacturer.

History
Originally named by the founding Price family as Price Brothers and Co. they began trading as wool merchants and the business evolved rapidly into manufacturing beds. In 1935 the name was changed to Relyon as the goal was to design beds that you could truly “rely on” for a good night’s sleep. Their philosophy is "your comfort is our paramount priority".

As members of FISP, Relyon are environmentally aware and adopt many green practices including sourcing their wood from FSC or PEFC sources. They were the first bed manufacturer to be awarded the accolade of the Production Guild Mark of the Worshipful Community of Furniture as well as being the first to receive the FIRA Gold Product Certification on their contract range of bed sets for the contract and hospitality market.

Relyon specialise in divan beds and mattresses, but do also manufacture guest beds, headboards and other bedroom furniture.

In 2001, Relyon was acquired by Steinhoff International. In November 2019, Steinhoff sold Relyon, and chains Bensons for Beds and Harveys, to UK-based private equity group Alteri Investors.

Today, Relyon's workforce sits at almost 500 and their headquarters remains in Wellington, Somerset. Their beds carry a 5-year guarantee as standard.

References

External links 
 Relyon Official Website

British furniture makers
Companies based in Somerset